Highlaws is a hamlet in the civil parish of Holme Abbey in Cumbria, United Kingdom. It is situated approximately two-and-a-quarter miles south-west of Abbeytown, one-and-a-half miles east of Pelutho, and one mile to the north of Aldoth. Other nearby settlements include Mawbray, four-and-a-quarter miles to the south-west, Blitterlees, three miles to the north-west, Blackdyke, two-and-a-quarter miles due north, and Foulsyke. Carlisle, Cumbria's county town, is located twenty miles to the north-east.

History and etymology
The name of Highlaws comes from the Old English hēah-hlāw, meaning "high mounds". In the past, variant spellings included Heelawes,  Hielawes,  Highlows,  Hielows, and Hylaws.

The hamlet appears in a survey of Holm Cultram dating back to the year 1538, during the reign of 
Henry VIII. There were at least thirteen families resident in Highlaws at that time.

References

Hamlets in Cumbria
Allerdale